The Ghost of Hui Family is a 1972 Vietnamese 35mm black and white film directed by Lê Hoàng Hoa.

Plot
The film is based on a tale about a wealthy family in Saigon.  It was the first horror film made in Vietnam.

Background
In the early 1970s, many managers of cailuong theater chains were forced to shut due to the financial pressure that foreign language films put them under. The Dạ Lý Hương Theatre was able to avoid the crash and, in a gamble to save the troupe, and inspired by the successes of MGM's 1959 film Ben-Hur, tycoon Xuân (bầu Xuân) founded Dạ Lý Hương Films and employed filmmaker Lê Hoàng Hoa.

Screenplayer Nguyễn Thành Châu named the movie The Ghost of Uncle Hoa's Family, which was based on a tale involving the family of Jean-Baptist Hui Bon Hoa.  However,  Hui Bon Hoa's descendants sued the studio and forced them to change the name to The Ghost of Hui Family. It was filmed in Thủ Đức, Biên Hòa and Da Lat in 1972, and was the only product of Dạ Lý Hương company.

The final scene was filmed in the real private cemetery of the Hui Bon Hoa family with the permission of the family.

Production
 Studio : Dạ Lý Hương Films (Dạ-Lí-Hương Điện-ảnh Công-ti)
 Print : National Cinema Centre (Trung-tâm Quốc-gia Điện-ảnh)
 Sound : Nghiêm Xuân Trường, Lê Văn Kính

Cast

 Bạch Tuyết... Thúy Hồng
 Thanh Tú
 Dũng Thanh Lâm
 Tư Rọm
 Bà Năm Sa Đéc
 Ba Vân
 Nguyễn Thành Châu
 Tâm Phan
 Khả Năng
 Thanh Việt
 Minh Ngọc
 Tùng Lâm
 Thy Mai

In popular culture
The film title Con ma nhà họ Hứa has become a conversational phrase that means the "disappointed one", because the word Hứa means the "promise" in Vietnamese language.

See also
 Saigon Museum of Fine Arts
 Gerhard Armauer Hansen
 The Canterville Ghost

References

 許家女鬼
 Điểm mặt phim kinh dị Việt Nam dọa được khán giả
 The Ghost of Hui Family : Tales and truths
 The legacy of Hui Bon Hoa
 The true story of Hui Bon Hoa and "Uncle Hoa's Mansion"

Lê Hoàng Hoa
Vietnamese horror films
Vietnamese neo-noir films
Vietnamese supernatural horror films
Gothic horror films
Film noir
1972 horror films
1972 films